The Last Enemy may refer to:

Literature 
 The Last Enemy (autobiography), a 1942 autobiographical book by pilot Richard Hillary
 "Last Enemy", a 1950 science fiction short story by H. Beam Piper
 A science fiction short story in Barry B. Longyear's collection The Enemy Papers
 A novel about a young Englishman by Leonard Strong
 The Last Enemy (play), a 1929 play by Frank Harvey

Television 
 The Last Enemy (TV series), a 2008 drama series about post-7/7 Britain
 "The Last Enemy" (Space: 1999), an episode of the 1975–77 science fiction series Space: 1999
 "The Last Enemy" (Inspector Morse), a 1989 episode of the British crime series
 An episode of the American adventure series Kodiak

Other uses 
 The Last Enemy (film), a 1938 Italian film directed by Umberto Barbaro
 A song on the Arch Enemy album Rise of the Tyrant
 A comic in the series Chronicles of Wormwood